Courts of Iowa include:
;State courts of Iowa
Iowa Supreme Court
Iowa Court of Appeals
Iowa District Courts (8 districts)

Federal courts located in Iowa
United States District Court for the Northern District of Iowa
United States District Court for the Southern District of Iowa

Former federal courts of Iowa
United States District Court for the District of Iowa (extinct, subdivided)

References

External links
National Center for State Courts – directory of state court websites.

Courts in the United States